Frances Herrmann (born 22 June 1989) is a Paralympian athlete from Germany competing mainly in category F34 throwing events.

She competed in the 2008 Summer Paralympics in Beijing, China. There she won a silver medal in the women's F32-34/51-53 discus throw event as well as competing in the F32-34/52/53 shot put and the F33/34/52/53 javelin throw.

References

External links
 
 

Paralympic athletes of Germany
Athletes (track and field) at the 2008 Summer Paralympics
Athletes (track and field) at the 2012 Summer Paralympics
Paralympic silver medalists for Germany
German female javelin throwers
German female discus throwers
German female shot putters
Living people
1989 births
Medalists at the 2008 Summer Paralympics
Paralympic medalists in athletics (track and field)
Athletes (track and field) at the 2020 Summer Paralympics
21st-century German women